The 1936 Soviet Cup was the first season of the Soviet Union.

Competition schedule

First round
 [Jul 18]
 Arsenal Kiev                 3-3  Krasnoye Znamya Yegoryevsk 
 BOLSHEVIK Kiev               w/o  CDKA-2 Moskva 
 Burevestnik Leningrad        2-6  DINAMO-2 Moskva 
 Burevestnik Rostov-na-Donu   0-3  INFIZKULT Moskva 
 DZERZHINETS Bezhitsa         2-1  Lokomotiv Voronezh 
 DINAMO Batumi                7-1  MedKombinat Alaverdi 
   [? – R.Gusov] 
 DINAMO Chelyabinsk           3-1  Spartak Omsk 
   [G.Falkovskiy 29, 79, Isakov 70 pen – L.Shishkin (D) 57 og] 
 DINAMO Krasnodar             w/o  Krasny Oktyabr Stalingrad 
 DINAMO Krivoi Rog            5-0  ZiI Mariupol  
 Dinamo Minsk                 1-5  PROLETARSKAYA POBEDA Moskva 
   [? – Babashin-3, Artyomov, Sakharov] 
 DINAMO Voronezh              w/o  Krasnoye Znamya Orekhovo-Zuyevo 
 DINAMO-TRUDKOMMUNA Bolshevo  5-0  Lokomotiv Leningrad 
 DZERZHINETS Bezhitsa         2-1  Lokomotiv Voronezh 
 HPZ Kharkov                  3-1  Sniper Podolsk 
 KRASNOYE ZNAMYA Noginsk      w/o  Gornyak Krivoi Rog 
 Krylya Sovetov Zaporozhye    1-1  Lokomotiv Kharkov  
 MORSKOI ZAVOD Sevastopol     1-0  Lokomotiv Dnepropetrovsk 
   [Kulikov] 
 RECORD Moskva                3-2  Rodina Moskva  
 SERP I MOLOT Kharkov         3-1  Dinamo-TrudKommuna Lyubertsy 
 Spartak Ivanovo              1-6  LOKOMOTIV-2 Moskva 
   [Boris Shchibrov 29 - ?] 
 STAL Konstantinovka          3-1  Burevestnik Moskva 
   [M.Lomov 10, A.Yakovlev 65, I.Gorobets 83 - ?] 
 Zenit Izhevsk                1-11 DINAMO Sverdlovsk 
 ZiD Dneprodzerzhinsk         0-1  PRAVDA Moskva                    [aet] 
 ZiK Makeyevka                0-3  ELEKTROMASHZAVOD Kharkov 
 ZIM Nikolayev                3-0  Spartak Kiev 
 ZIP Dnepropetrovsk          10-0  Farforovy Zavod Baranovka   
 ZIF Konstantinovka           3-1  Burevestnik Moskva 
 [Jul 19] 
 DKA Smolensk                 4-1  Energiya Moskva 
 [Jul 21]
 DINAMO Aktyubinsk            w/o  Dinamo Kuibyshev 
 DZERZHINETS Kolomna          w/o  Spartak Kuibyshev 
 TRUDOVAYA KOMMUNA Kungur     w/o  Spartak Kalinin  
 [Jul 22] 
 DZERZHINETS-STZ Stalingrad   4-0  DonGosTabFabrika Rostov-na-Donu 
   [Alexandr Ponomaryov 17, 60 pen, Alexandr Sapronov 75, Sergei Kolesnikov 76]

First round replays
 [Jul 19] 
 Arsenal Kiev                 0-3  KRASNOYE ZNAMYA Yegoryevsk 
 [Jul 20] 
 Krylya Sovetov Zaporozhye    1-1  Lokomotiv Kharkov                [aet] 
 [Jul 26] 
 Krylya Sovetov Zaporozhye    0-5  LOKOMOTIV Kharkov

Second round
 [Jul 24] 
 Bolshevik Kiev                2-6  DINAMO Odessa 
 DINAMO Gorkiy                 4-3  Record Moskva  
 DINAMO Pyatigorsk             w/o  Pravda Moskva 
 DINAMO Rostov-na-Donu         6-2  Proletarskaya Pobeda Moskva 
 Dinamo Voronezh               0-2  SPARTAK Moskva 
   [Vladimir Stepanov 22, Georgiy Glazkov 76] 
 DINAMO-TRUDKOMMUNA Bolshevo   6-1  Lokomotiv Kiev 
 DZERZHINETS Bezhitsa          3-2  Krylya Sovetov Moskva 
   [N.Shilin 18, 50, A.Khomyakov ? - ?] 
 Dzerzhinets Kolomna           0-9  SPARTAK Leningrad 
 ELEKTROMASHZAVOD Kharkov      1-0  Stal Dnepropetrovsk 
   [A.Fyodorov 23] 
 KRASNOYE ZNAMYA Noginsk       3-0  Ugolshchiki Stalino 
 KRASNOYE ZNAMYA Yegoryevsk    w/o  Dinamo Kiev 
 Morskoi Zavod Sevastopol      2-3  TRAKTORNY ZAVOD Kharkov 
   [A.Vyshnevskiy 33 pen, V.Shitikov 37 – V.Makarov 20, ?, ?] 
 STAKHANOVETS Kadiyevka        w/o  Dinamo Moskva 
 Trudovaya Kommuna Kungur      0-7  LOKOMOTIV Moskva  
   [Viktor Lavrov-4, ?, ?, ?] 
 ZIM Nikolayev                 1-0  KinAp Odesa  
 [Jul 25]
 DINAMO-2 Moskva               3-0  Vympel Kiev  
 Serp i Molot Kharkov          1-1  Stalinets Moskva 
   [Fyodor Lukyanchenko 50 – Sergei Ivanov 61] 
 [Jul 26] 
 Dinamo Aktyubinsk             0-4  CDKA Moskva 
   [Ivan Mitronov 52, ?, ?, ?] 
 HPZ Kharkov                   0-2  ZIS Moskva 
   [Viktor Semyonov 67, K.Us (H) 75 og] 
 Kolkhoz Chapayeva Zolotonosha 0-15 SERP I MOLOT Moskva 
   [Pavel Kudryavtsev 4, Grigoriy Fedotov 5, ?...] 
 Lokomotiv-2 Moskva            1-7  STALINETS Leningrad 
   [? – K.Sazonov-2, Viktor Smagin, Alexei Larionov, Boris Ivin, Alexandr Zyablikov, Alexandr Gnezdov] 
 ZiP Dnepropetrovsk            0-5  DINAMO Kharkov 
 [Jul 27] 
 DINAMO Kazan                  w/o  Dinamo Chelyabinsk 
 DINAMO Sverdlovsk             w/o  GAZ Gorkiy 
 DKA Smolensk                  2-3  KRASNAYA ZARYA Leningrad 
   [P.Petrov 40, 78 - ?] 
 INFIZKULT Moskva              w/o  Dinamo Baku 
 [Jul 28] 
 Dinamo Batumi                 0-2  DINAMO Tbilisi 
   [Mikhail Berdzenishvili-2] 
 Dinamo Krasnodar              0-3  LOKOMOTIV Tbilisi 
 Dinamo Krivoi Rog             2-5  STROITELI Baku 
 DZERZHINETS-STZ Stalingrad    w/o  Dinamo Dnepropetrovsk 
 [Jul 30] 
 Stal Konstantinovka           2-3  SPARTAK Kharkov 
 [Aug 2] 
 Lokomotiv Kharkov             2-2  Dinamo Leningrad             [aet] 
   [Boris Gurkin 6, 111 – Pyotr Dementyev 18, Boris Shelagin 118 pen]

Second round replays
 [Jul 27] 
 SERP I MOLOT Kharkov          2-1  Stalinets Moskva 
   [Georgiy Toporkov 52, Vladimir Prasolov 54 - ?] 
 [Aug 4] 
 Lokomotiv Kharkov             1-1  Dinamo Leningrad 
   [Zub 14 pen – Pyotr Dementyev 30] 
 [Aug 7] 
 Lokomotiv Kharkov             0-1  DINAMO Leningrad 
   [Pyotr Dementyev 43]

Third round
 [Jul 30] 
 Dinamo Gorkiy                 0-2  STALINETS Leningrad 
   [Viktor Smagin 68, Alexei Larionov 79] 
 Dinamo-TrudKommuna Bolshevo   0-2  KRASNAYA ZARYA Leningrad 
   [Alexei Tsvilikh-2] 
 SERP I MOLOT Kharkov          5-1  Traktorny Zavod Kharkov 
   [Fyodor Morgunov 15, 65, Alexandr Timchenko 60 pen, Vladimir Prasolov 75, Georgiy Toporkov 78 – Ivan Gruber 81 pen] 
 SERP I MOLOT Moskva           3-2  Dinamo-2 Moskva 
   [Grigoriy Fedotov 77, 85, Sergei Kuzin 86 - ?] 
 Stakhanovets Kadiyevka        0-2  ELEKTROMASHZAVOD Kharkov      
 ZiM Nikolayev                 0-3  SPARTAK Leningrad 
 [Aug 1] 
 Dinamo Kharkov                0-1  LOKOMOTIV Moskva 
   [Viktor Lavrov 65 pen] 
 [Aug 2] 
 Dinamo Kazan                  1-2  ZIS Moskva 
   [Ivan Borisevich 85 - ?] 
 Krasnoye Znamya Yegoryevsk    0-4  KRASNOYE ZNAMYA Noginsk       
 [Aug 3] 
 DINAMO Tbilisi                3-2  Stroiteli Baku               [aet] 
   [Mikhail Berdenishvili 17 pen, 67 pen, Mikhail Aslamazov 93 – Aram Stepanov 9, Arkadiy Amirjanov 90] 
 Dzerzhinets Bezhitsa          0-3  DZERZHINETS-STZ Stalingrad  
   [A.Voyevodin 40, Alexandr Ponomaryov 57, 80] 
 [Aug 4] 
 SPARTAK Moskva                4-0  Spartak Kharkov 
   [Pyotr Nikiforov, Georgiy Glazkov, Leonid Rumyantsev, Stanislav Leuta] 
 [Aug 6] 
 Dinamo Sverdlovsk             0-6  DINAMO Rostov-na-Donu 
   [Sergei Dombazov, Viktor Berezhnoi, Valeriy Bekhtenev, Iosif Kurabo, ?, ?] 
 [Aug 8] 
 CDKA Moskva                   1-2  DINAMO Pyatigorsk 
   [Konstantin Malinin 15 - Vasiliy Motlokhov 38 pen, Tengiz Gavasheli 57] 
 [Aug 10] 
 Lokomotiv Tbilisi             2-2  Dinamo Odessa 
   [Gayoz Jejelava 63, ? 68 – Leonid Orekhov 16, Makar Gichkin 44] 
 [Aug 11] 
 InFizKult Moskva              1-4  DINAMO Leningrad 
   [? – Nikolai Svetlov-2, Pyotr Dementyev-2]

Third round replays
 [Aug 12] 
 Lokomotiv Tbilisi             3-4  DINAMO Odessa 
   [Georgiy Apridonidze 56, 81, Luasarb Loladze 60 - Mikhail Heison 35, 64, Leonid Orekhov 47, 69]

Fourth round
 [Aug 5]
 LOKOMOTIV Moskva              3-0  Spartak Leningrad 
   [Viktor Lavrov, ?, ?]
 [Aug 8] 
 SERP I MOLOT Kharkov          3-1  ElektroMashZavod Kharkov 
   [Fyodor Morgunov 38, Vladimir Prasolov 42, ? 85 – A.Naprasnikov 44]
 Stalinets Leningrad           0-3  SPARTAK Moskva 
   [Pyotr Nikiforov 15, Andrei Starostin 43, 87]
 [Aug 12] 
 Dzerzhinets-STZ Stalingrad    1-3  DINAMO Tbilisi 
   [Alexandr Ponomaryov 8 – Boris Paichadze 50, 87, Mikhail Berdzenishvili 64 pen]
 [Aug 13] 
 KRASNAYA ZARYA Leningrad      2-1  Dinamo Rostov-na-Donu 
   [Pyotr Artemyev 23, 72 – Viktor Berezhnoi 6]
 ZIS Moskva                    4-2  Dinamo Pyatigorsk 
   [Viktor Semyonov 21, Alexei Shumov 27, Pyotr Ivanov ?, Anatoliy Yemelyanov ? – Vasiliy Motlokhov 43, 61] 
 [Aug 17] 
 DINAMO Leningrad              3-2  Serp i Molot Moskva 
   [Mikhail Butusov 31 pen, Pyotr Dementyev 61, 87 – Alexei Zaitsev 9, Grigoriy Fedotov 88]
 [Aug 18] 
 KRASNOYE ZNAMYA Noginsk       w/o  Dinamo Odessa

Quarterfinals

 The Kharkiv team tried to protest the match result due to poor refereeing, but their appeal was declined. While not refereeing for this match, one of referees Viktor Ryabokon was the president of the Lokomotiv sports society.

 The match was interrupted due to lack of lighting and its extra time never played. It was decided to replay the match on 20 August and this match was annulled.

Quarterfinals replays

 On 20 August 1936 officially in the Soviet Union, there was adopted a Georgian name for Tiflis, Tbilisi.

Semifinals

Final

Bracket

External links
 Complete calendar. helmsoccer.narod.ru
 1936 Soviet Cup. Footballfacts.ru
 1936 Soviet football season. RSSSF
 Протоколы кубка СССР 1936 года. fc-dynamo.ru.

Soviet Cup seasons
Cup
Soviet Cup